The women's 3000 metres in speed skating at the 1994 Winter Olympics took place on 17 February, at the Hamar Olympic Hall. 27 competitors from 14 nations participated in competition.

Records
Prior to this competition, the existing world and Olympic records were as follows:

Results

References

Women's speed skating at the 1994 Winter Olympics
Skat